Stjernen (The Star) is the present boat used by the King of Norway for short sea transport on official occasions. The  pine boat was designed by Richard Gustav Furuholmen and built in 1935 by Anker og Jensen in Asker for merchant Nicolay Eger who named her Estrella. She was originally powered by a 75 hp Penta P62 but is now powered by a 320 hp Volvo Penta motor.

Estrella was confiscated by the Germans during the German occupation of Norway and was at the disposal of Reichkommisar Josef Terboven. King Haakon VII of Norway had been promised a Royal Yacht when he accepted the Norwegian throne in 1905, but this would not come through until 1947 when he was given the HNoMY Norge. In 1945 the Royal Court therefore acquired Estrella and named her Stjernen after the previous Stjernen I which had also been confiscated by the Germans but was returned as a wreck. The present Stjernen is still in use by the King and his family and, like Norge, Stjernen is crewed by sailors from the Royal Norwegian Navy. The crew consist of three seamen and one junior officer who live aboard 14 days at a time.

The names of the two Stjernens are complex. From 1899 to 1940 the original Stjernen was named just Stjernen. In 1945 this boat was no longer operational and was no longer called Stjernen. This freed up the name for the present Stjernen which is also simply named Stjernen. When the old Stjernen was restored she was renamed Stjernen I and is also called Stjernen av 1899.

Sources 

 

 

1935 ships
Royal and presidential yachts
Ships built in Norway
World War II auxiliary ships of Germany
Ships of Norway